Nikola Jambor (born 25 September 1995) is a Croatian footballer who plays for Slaven Belupo.

Club career
On 28 June 2021, he joined Moreirense on a three-year contract.

References

 

1995 births
Living people
Sportspeople from Koprivnica
Association football midfielders
Croatian footballers
NK Slaven Belupo players
K.S.C. Lokeren Oost-Vlaanderen players
NK Osijek players
Rio Ave F.C. players
Moreirense F.C. players
Croatian Football League players
Belgian Pro League players
Primeira Liga players
Croatian expatriate footballers
Expatriate footballers in Belgium
Expatriate footballers in Portugal
Croatian expatriate sportspeople in Belgium
Croatian expatriate sportspeople in Portugal